Move fast and break things may refer to:
Move fast and break things (motto), internal motto used by Facebook until 2014, as coined by Mark Zuckerberg
Move Fast and Break Things (book), 2017 book by Jonathan Taplin subtitled How Facebook, Google and Amazon Have Cornered Culture and Undermined Democracy